Gephyromantis decaryi, commonly known as Decary's Madagascar frog, is a species of frog in the family Mantellidae.  It is endemic to Madagascar.  Its natural habitats are subtropical or tropical moist lowland forests, subtropical or tropical moist montane forests, and heavily degraded former forest.  It is threatened by habitat loss.

References

decaryi
Endemic frogs of Madagascar
Taxa named by Fernand Angel
Amphibians described in 1930
Taxonomy articles created by Polbot